Pain Mahalleh-ye Zemidan (also Romanized as Pā’īn Maḩalleh-ye Zemīdān) is a village in Layl Rural District, in the Central District of Lahijan County, Gilan Province, Iran. At the 2006 census, its population was 286, in 79 families.

References 

Populated places in Lahijan County